The Nadeau River (in French: rivière Nadeau) is a tributary of the west bank of the Chaudière River which flows northward to empty onto the south bank of the St. Lawrence River. It flows in the administrative region of Chaudière-Appalaches, in Quebec, in Canada, in the Robert-Cliche Regional County Municipality (in the municipality of Saint-Séverin)
and La Nouvelle-Beauce Regional County Municipality (in the municipalities of Saint-Elzéar, of Sainte-Marie-de-Beauce, of Vallée-Jonction).

Geography 

The main neighboring watersheds of the Nadeau River are:
 north side: Savoie River, Vallée River, Chaudière River;
 east side: Chaudière River;
 south side: Lessard River, Cliche River, rivière des Fermes, Cinq River;
 west side: Aulnaies stream, Beaurivage River, Fourchette River, Filkars River, Palmer East River.

From its source, the Nadeau River flows over  divided into the following segments:
  north-east, in the municipality of Saint-Séverin, to a country road which delimits Saint-Séverin and Saint-Elzéar;
  northeasterly, to rang Saint-Olivier road;
  north-east, collecting the water from the Guay stream (coming from the north-west), to the chemin du rang Saint-Jacques;
  north-east, to a country road delimiting the municipalities of Saint-Elzéar and Sainte-Marie-de-Beauce;
  eastward, up to the limit of Vallée-Jonction;
  eastward, up to its confluence.

The Nadeau river empties on the west bank of the Chaudière River, in Vallée-Jonction.

Toponymy 
The toponym Rivière Nadeau was formalized on December 5, 1968, at the Commission de toponymie du Québec.

See also 
 List of rivers of Quebec

References 

Rivers of Chaudière-Appalaches
Beauce-Centre Regional County Municipality
La Nouvelle-Beauce Regional County Municipality